Park Kyung-mee (born 15 October 1965) is a South Korean politician who served as the Spokesperson of President Moon Jae-in from 2021 to 2022. She was previously a professor of mathematics education at Hongik University and Chungbuk National University.

She is widely known to the public for her educational books on mathematics. After becoming a politician, she continues such effort through her YouTube channel. She also hosted a famous TV debate programme at MBC in 2014 becoming its first female host in its history which dates back to 1999.

In the 2016 general election, Park was the first candidate to be named for Democratic Party's proportional representation list. As a parliamentarian, she took numerous roles in her party such as its spokesperson, floor spokesperson and deputy floor leader - twice from 2017 to 2018 and again in 2019 to 2020.

After losing her re-election in 2020, Park was brought to the Office of the President as President Moon's secretary for education. In April 2021, she was promoted to his spokesperson.

Park holds three degrees - a bachelor in mathematics education from Seoul National University and a master's in mathematics and a doctorate in mathematics education from University of Illinois at Urbana–Champaign.

Electoral history

References 

Living people
1965 births
21st-century South Korean politicians
Members of the National Assembly (South Korea)
20th-century South Korean mathematicians
Seoul National University alumni
Academic staff of Hongik University
Academic staff of Chungbuk National University
University of Illinois College of Education alumni
Minjoo Party of Korea politicians
South Korean government officials
South Korean women academics
21st-century South Korean women politicians
21st-century South Korean mathematicians
Female members of the National Assembly (South Korea)